The Buffalo Bandits are a lacrosse team based in Buffalo, New York playing in the National Lacrosse League (NLL). The 2022 season is their 30th season in the NLL. the Buffalo Bandits has returned to play after the entire 2021 season was cancelled due to Covid 19. they will be starting the season on December 4th at home.

Regular season

NLL Standings

East Division

Buffalo Bandits 9-1
Halifax Thunderbirds 8-2
Toronto Rock 7-4
Albany Firewolves 6-7
Philadelphia Wings 5-6
Georgia Swarm 5-6
Rochester Knighthawks 3-7
New York Riptide 2-8

West Division

San Diego Seals 8-2
Colorado Mammoth 6-4
Vancouver Warriors 5-5
Calgary Roughnecks 3-6
Panther City Lacrosse Club 4-8
Saskatchewan Rush 3-8

Game log

Playoffs

Roster

Entry Draft
The 2021 NLL Entry Draft took place on August 28, 2021. The Bandits made the following selections:

References

Buffalo
Buffalo Bandits seasons
Buffalo Bandits